The Rockerz were an American rock band originally from Atlanta, Georgia, United States, that experienced popularity in the Southeastern United States during the 1990s-2000s. The band released three albums on the Castle Records label, "If You came Here for The Party...," "Sand in My Shoes" and "Big News in a Small Town" with modest success and performed hundreds of shows throughout the Southeastern United States during their career, spanning more than two decades.

Career

Formed in 1995, The Rockerz were a group of experienced studio and live musicians who performed with such artists as Marshall Tucker, Molly Hatchet, Classic Rock AllStars, Southern Rock AllStars, David Allan Coe, Dennnis Yost & the Classics IV, The Tams, The Drifters, and Archie Bell & the Drells.

The original lineup of The Rockerz included Steve Guettler on vocals and rhythm guitar, Jeff Strickler on bass guitar, Steve Farrell on lead guitar, Wes Armstrong on drums, and in 1997 the addition of Mike Wilson on keyboards.

Early rehearsals were held at Castle Studios in the Lawrenceville suburb of Atlanta, Georgia, beginning in 1995. The Rockerz first performed live together at the 1996 Summer Olympics in Atlanta, Georgia, then toured as back-up band to Dennnis Yost & the Classics IV and Archie Bell & the Drells during the 1990s. 

The band released two albums on the Castle Records label, "If You Came Here for The Party..." and "Sand in My Shoes" and toured extensively throughout the 1990s-2000s. In 2011, The Rockerz released their third album on the Castle Records label, "Big News in a Small Town" recorded at the Sound Kitchen in Nashville and mastered at Real2Real Studios in Atlanta.

Members

Original lineup
 Steve "Stevie G." Guettler (vocals & guitar)
 Jeff "JT" Strickler (bass)
 Steve Farrell (guitar)
 Wes Armstrong (drums)
 Mike Wilson (keyboards)

Later members
 Bob "Machinegun" Micelli (keyboards)
 Ray "Animal" Thackston (drums)
 Brad Slipiec (keyboards)
 James Coker (drums)
 Frankie Aster (bass)
 Bill Whitley (drums)
 Will DeBouver (drums)

Discography

Studio albums
 "If You Came Here for The Party..." (1996/Castle Records)
 "Sand in My Shoes" (2006/Castle Records)
 "Big News in a Small Town" (2011/Castle Records)

Singles discography

Studio singles
 "If You Came Here for The Party..." (1996/Castle Records)
 "When I See You Smile" (2006/Castle Records)
 "Hit The Door" (2006/Castle Records)
 "Big News in a Small Town" (2011/Castle Records)
 "Danced in The Rain" (2011/Castle Records)

References
 Sparks, Todd. "The Rockerz", GTS Entertainment Group, Panama City, Florida, June 10, 1998.
 Jones, Don. "Media Release", The City of Kennesaw, Kennesaw, Georgia, May 24, 2007.
 Thompson, J.C. "The Rockerz Headline July 3 Concert in Kennesaw", The Bright Side, Volume 16, No. 6, Kennesaw, Georgia, June 2007.
 Morrison, Chloe. "LaFayette plans July 4 Freedom Festival", The Times Free Press, Chattanooga, Tennessee, June 23, 2008.
 McCoy, Kelly. "KZ106 30th Anniversary Party", WSKZ-KZ106, Chattanooga, Tennessee, August 17, 1998.
 Stillwell, Don. "LaFayette Freedom Festival", The Walker Messenger, LaFayette, Georgia, June 15, 2009.

External links
 Official Website
 The Rockerz on Facebook
  on iTunes
  on Amazon

Musical groups established in 1995
Musical groups from Atlanta